Salt-and-pepper noise, also known as impulse noise, is a form of noise sometimes seen on digital images. This noise can be caused by sharp and sudden disturbances in the image signal. It presents itself as sparsely occurring white and black pixels.

An effective noise reduction method for this type of noise is a median filter or a morphological filter. For reducing either salt noise or pepper noise, but not both, a contraharmonic mean filter can be effective.

See also
 Defective pixel

References

Noise (graphics)
Digital photography
Image noise reduction techniques